HIV is the human immunodeficiency virus, two species of Lentivirus that causes HIV/AIDS.

HIV or Hiv may also refer to:

HIV/AIDS
 HIV test, used to detect the presence of HIV 
 HIV-positive people, people who have the human immunodeficiency virus HIV, the agent of the currently incurable disease AIDS
 HIV vaccine, the goal of many HIV research programmes

Other uses
 .hiv, a generic top-level domain
 Hiv Rural District, in Alborz Province of Iran
 Hiv, Iran, a village in the district
 H.I.V (album), a 2012 album by Jovi

See also
 HIV/AIDS (human immunodeficiency virus infection and acquired immune deficiency syndrome), a spectrum of conditions caused by HIV